Melegnano (formerly Marignano) is a town and comune in Italy, in the province of Milan, region of Lombardy. It received the honorary title of city with a presidential decree on 26 August 1959.

The town is served by the Melegnano railway station.

History
Melegnano was a stronghold of Milan in the Italian Wars, and known particularly for the Battle of Marignano, a victory over the Swiss in 1515.  It is also known for the battles between the French and Austrians in the Second Italian War of Independence (1859).

Twin towns
Melegnano is twinned with:

  Paullo, Italy, since 2007
  Paris,  France, since 2009

Main sights
Church of St. John the Baptist, housing an oil painting by Borgognone.
Medici Castle, with frescoed halls depicting military deeds of the Medici and views of German cities and of Lake Como.
Parchetto of Melegnano, with trees and benches famous for the old people created by Leonardo da Vinci

References